The 2020 World Sprint Speed Skating Championships were held at the Vikingskipet in Hamar, Norway, from 28 to 29 February 2020.

Schedule
All times are local (UTC+1).

Medal summary

Medal table

Medalists

References

External links
Official website

 
World Sprint Speed Skating
World Sprint Championships
2020 Sprint Speed Skating Championships
World Sprint Speed Skating
2020 World Sprint Speed Skating Championships
2020 Sprint